Pedioplanis burchelli, known commonly as Burchell's sand lizard, is a species of lizard in the family Lacertidae. The species is native to Southern Africa.

Etymology
The specific name, burchelli, is in honor of William John Burchell who was an English explorer and naturalist.

Range
P. burchelli is found in Lesotho and the Republic of South Africa.

Habitat
The preferred natural habitats of P. burchelli are savanna, shrubland, and grassland.

Description
Coloration is very variable. The lower eyelid is opaque, without any transparent "window" scales. There are no enlarged temporal or tympanic shields.

Reproduction
P. burchelli is oviparous. Clutch size is 4-6 eggs.

References

Further reading
Duméril AMC, Bibron G (1839). Erpétologie générale ou Histoire naturelle complète des Reptiles. Tome cinquième [Volume 5]. Paris: Roret. viii + 854 pp. (Eremias burchelli, new species, pp. 303–304). (in French).
Kirchhof S, Penner J, Rödel M-O, Müller J (2017). "Resolution of the types, diagnostic features, and distribution of two easily confused Sand Lizards, Pedioplanis laticeps (Smith, 1845) and P. burchelli (Duméril & Bibron, 1839) (Squamata: Lacertidae)". Zootaxa 4318 (1): 082–109.
Nkosi WT, Heideman NJL, Van Wyk JH (2004). "Reproduction and Sexual Size Dimorphism in the Lacertid Lizard Pedioplanus burchelli (Sauria: Lacertidae) in SouthAfrica". Journal of Herpetology 38 (4): 473–480.
Tolley KA, Makokha JS, Houniet DT, Swart BL, Matthee CA (2009). "The potential for predicted climate shifts to impact genetic landscapes of lizards in the South African Cape Floristic Region". Molecular Phylogenetics and Evolution 51 (1): 120–130.

Pedioplanis
Lacertid lizards of Africa
Reptiles of Lesotho
Reptiles of South Africa
Reptiles described in 1839
Taxa named by André Marie Constant Duméril
Taxa named by Gabriel Bibron